The  Sharpe SA-1 is an American single seat homebuilt aircraft.

Design and development
The SA-1 is a single place conventional landing gear-equipped mid-wing aircraft developed in 1957. The wing is constructed from a cut-down Luscombe 8. The landing gear is from a J-3 Cub.

Specifications (SA-1)

See also

References

Homebuilt aircraft